USS Chatham (CVE-32) (originally designated AVG-32, then later ACV-32) was built at the Seattle-Tacoma S/Y, Hull #27, Seattle, Washington and transferred to the United Kingdom 11 August 1943 under lend-lease and renamed HMS Slinger (D26).  Outfitted by the British as a transport carrier, the ship was mined on 5 February 1944 but returned to service, 17 October.  In 1945, she was transferred for service in the Pacific as a fighter carrier and was attached to the 30th Aircraft Carrier Squadron.  Following the war, she was returned to United States custody on 27 February 1946 and was sold/converted by Robin Line 21 November 1946 as Robin Mowbray. Moore-McCormack Lines, Inc., purchased Robin Line in 1958.  She was scrapped in Kaohsiung Taiwan in 1969-1970.

Design and description
The  were larger and had a greater aircraft capacity than preceding American built escort carriers. They were also all laid down as escort carriers and not converted merchant ships.

Armament comprised: two 4"/50, 5"/38 or 5"/51 dual purpose guns in single mounts, sixteen 40 mm Bofors anti-aircraft guns in twin mounts and twenty 20 mm Oerlikon anti-aircraft cannons in single mounts. They had a maximum aircraft capacity of twenty-four aircraft which could be a mixture of Grumman Martlet, Vought F4U Corsair or Hawker Sea Hurricane fighter aircraft and Fairey Swordfish or Grumman Avenger anti-submarine aircraft.

Notes

References
 

 

Ruler-class escort carriers
Ships built in Seattle
 
1943 ships